The 1952–53 Challenge Cup was the 52nd staging of rugby league's oldest knockout competition, the Challenge Cup.

First round

Second round

Quarterfinals
A club record 69,429 people watch the Challenge Cup 3rd Round tie at Odsal between Bradford Northern and Huddersfield. Larger crowds had watched matches at Odsal, but this was the largest involving the home side.

Semifinals

Final
In the final, Huddersfield beat St. Helens 15-10 at Wembley in front of a crowd of 89,588. This produced a record gate taking for a Challenge Cup final of £31,000.

This was Huddersfield’s sixth Cup final win in seven Final appearances, including one win during the Second World War. coached by William R. 'Bill' Smith, their stand-off half, Peter Ramsden, became the youngest player to win the Lance Todd Trophy for man-of-the-match at 19. the Huddersfield team also featured Australian Pat Devery and New Zealand's Peter Henderson.

References

Challenge Cup
Challenge Cup